Saint Pontius may refer to a number of Catholic saints:

 Pontius of Carthage (mid-third century), Christian saint and Latin author from Carthage
 Pontius of Cimiez (died 257), Roman saint
 Ebontius (died 1104), also known as Pontius, Bishop of Barbastro, Spain